Westbury or Bratton White Horse is a hill figure on the escarpment of Salisbury Plain, approximately  east of Westbury in Wiltshire, England. Located on the edge of Bratton Downs and lying just below an Iron Age hill fort, it is the oldest of several white horses carved in Wiltshire. It was restored in 1778, an action which may have obliterated another horse that had occupied the same slope. A contemporary engraving from around 1772 appears to show a horse facing in the opposite direction that was rather smaller than the present figure. There is, however, no documentation or other evidence for the existence of a chalk horse at Westbury before 1772.

It is also considered a symbol for Wiltshire as a whole.

Origins 

Although it is the oldest of the Wiltshire white horses, the origin of Westbury White Horse is obscure. It is often claimed to commemorate King Alfred's victory at the Battle of Ethandun in 878, and while this is quite plausible, there is no trace of such a legend before the second half of the 18th century. Perhaps more believable is a theory that it was created at a much later date to commemorate this early "English victory", particularly as King Alfred had a very strong following in England from the 17th Century onwards, see for example King Alfred's Tower.

Historians have generally located the battle of Ethandun or Edington on the high ground, somewhere within a few kilometres of the white horse, which would have been a strong defensive position for Alfred and the Saxons of Wessex, marching north-east from Egbert's Stone (popularly believed to be located at Kingston Deverill or King Alfred's Tower nearby), whilst facing the Danes led by Guthram, advancing south-west from their stronghold in Chippenham. It is popularly believed that Bratton Castle, the iron age hillfort immediately adjacent to the white horse may have played some part in the battle, but there is no evidence of this, and the 'fortress' referenced in Medieval texts is much more likely to have been the Anglo-Saxon settlement of Chippenham, which had been occupied by Guthram's Danes as their headquarters. Local legend asserts that the defeated Danes fled down the slopes to the springs that rise between the villages of Bratton and Edington (after which the battle was named), and the slopes on which the white horse is located. Again, according to local legend, many exhausted Danes were massacred in the woods and boggy ground there by pursuing Saxons, the survivors fleeing north-eastwards, pursued by Alfred's men all the way to Chippenham. However, there are some who dispute this account and believe this key battle was fought elsewhere, as there is very little real evidence either way, it remains contested, although the majority agree the vicinity of Edington is the most likely, and logical site.

A local site, just to the north-east of the white horse is Luccombe Vale, which has a locally famed 'bloodstone' said to be connected with the massacre of Danish prisoners after the battle.

According to local tradition, the current white horse was cut in 1778 by a Mr Gee, who overlaid a smaller, older chalk figure, believed to also have been a horse, the only surviving image of which dates to 1772, and shows a figure facing the other way with a long tail. During the 19th and early 20th Centuries the figure was periodically reshaped and repaired.

Another hillside chalk figure, the Uffington White Horse, featured in King Alfred's early life. He was born in the Vale of White Horse, not far from Uffington in Oxfordshire. Unlike the recorded history of Westbury, documents as early as the eleventh century refer to the "White Horse Hill" at Uffington ("mons albi equi"), and archaeological work has dated the Uffington White Horse to the Bronze Age, although it is not certain that it was originally intended to represent a horse.

A white horse war standard was associated with the continental Saxons in the Dark Ages, and the figures of Hengest and Horsa who, according to legend, led the first Anglo-Saxon invaders into England, are said to have fought under a white horse standard (a claim recalled in the heraldic badge of the county of Kent).

During the 18th century, the white horse was a heraldic symbol associated with the new British Royal Family, the House of Hanover, and it is argued by some scholars that Westbury White Horse may have first been carved in the early 18th century as a symbol of loyalty to the new Protestant reigning house.

In Alfred and the Great White Horse of Wiltshire (1939), the Downside Abbey monk Dom Illtyd Trethowan debunked the suggested connection of the White Horse with Alfred and the Battle of Ethandune. Paul Newman suggests in his book Lost Gods of Albion (2009) that the horse may have been inspired by the popularity of folly buildings in the 18th century.

Wiltshire folklore has it that when the nearby Bratton church clock strikes midnight, the white horse goes down to the Bridewell Springs, below the hill, to drink.

Modern history 

By 1872 the horse was considered to have lost shape, by the chalk repeatedly growing over and being recut. In 1873 it was remodelled by a committee, and at the same time substantial edging-stones were added all around the perimeter, to prevent the shape from changing again.

During the Second World War, the chalk of the horse was turfed over to prevent German pilots from using it for navigation. Nearby Westbury was the site of a major railway hub, and internment camps for both foreign nationals (mostly Italians), and prisoners of war, who laboured on local farms and in local factories, later in the war it was also the site of a large US military base, so was considered a potential target.

The horse was illuminated at night in 1900 and again in 1950, both times using army equipment. For the 1950 event, which used world war two searchlights, traffic in Westbury and Bratton came almost to a standstill as drivers slowed down to look.

In 1957 the horse was concreted over and painted white by Westbury Urban District Council, in an attempt to save on long-term maintenance costs, as the chalk of the face was eroding and unstable, due to the steepness of the slope.

Since then, the concrete has tended to turn grey and deteriorate over time, requiring regular cleaning, as well as periodic repairs and repainting. It was thoroughly cleaned in 1993. and in 1995, the concrete facing from 1957 was replaced and repainted. Also in the early 1990s, it was given 'zebra stripes' of black plastic as a protest against a planned prison in Westbury.

In 2003, the horse was vandalised when "Stop This War" was written in yellow across the horse in capital letters in protest of the Iraq War. After the words were removed, the horse was noticeably grey with a white horizontal strip where the message had been. In November 2006, the horse was repaired and repainted again. The newly whitened horse was illuminated on the night the repairs were finished, by Second World War searchlights, as in 1950.

In July 2010, the neck of the horse was vandalised when the word "wonkey" was written across it. This part of the neck had to be rewhitened in 2010, leading to the horse having a whiter neck than the rest of the body.

The BBC reported that the horse was to be cleaned again in 2012. Work began on 11 April 2012 and was completed on 19 April 2012. The cleaning coincided with the Diamond Jubilee of Queen Elizabeth II. Celebrating the completion of the work, again the horse was lit up with searchlights. Since the annual Village Pump Festival moved from Farleigh Hungerford to the White Horse Country Park beneath the horse in 2012, the horse has been illuminated at night whilst the festival has been taking place. This is achieved via a tinted spotlight which changes colour every couple of seconds, so the horse appears different colours.

Two visitor information signs, on the hill above the horse and in the Viewing Area car park, were placed in 1999 following the completion of Devizes White Horse; the signs show all eight Wiltshire White Horses. Also on the side of the hill is a toposcope dated 1968, mounted on a small stone structure, which identifies the towns and cities that can be seen from the hillside. For the Golden Jubilee of Queen Elizabeth II, a fire beacon was placed to the side of the road on the top of the hill leading to the car park on 3 June 2002, that resembles the millennium beacons. It is lit sporadically, and was lit for the 70th anniversary of VE Day on 8 May 2015.

BBC News had a video in June 2018 showing the horse being cleaned with high pressure water jets by up to 18 volunteer abseilers. The cost was given as £3,000, paid for by Westbury Town Council. It stated that the previous clean was in 2016.

Views 
From the horse, Westbury and Trowbridge can be closely observed. The Mendip TV Mast on the Mendip Hills in Somerset can be seen clearly to the west, particularly at night. From the top of the horse and Bratton Castle, Devizes White Horse and Alton Barnes White Horse can both be viewed. The horse itself cannot be seen from other hill figures. Two of the furthest views of the horse are said to be from Beckford's Tower in Bath and from the tower of St Michael's Church, Dundry near Bristol.

A car park on Bratton Road on the B3098 which passes beneath the horse is known as Westbury White Horse Viewing Area. It has fifteen parking spaces and information boards on the horse.

In 1961 a  chimney was built at the Blue Circle cement works about a mile and a half away from the horse. The Blue Circle company was bought in 2001 by Lafarge and the chimney was last used in 2010: it was demolished on 18 September 2016. Some considered it an eyesore whilst others considered it a local icon, a debate covered by a BBC Wiltshire radio broadcast in 2011. Many further views of the horse also included the chimney and the chimney was the most prominent feature of the view from the horse; some considered the chimney to spoil views from the hill. As the horse has been vandalised several times, so too the chimney was defaced in 2010 by the addition of a Union Jack flag.

The landscape of the horse was threatened in 2013 when Wiltshire Council revealed plans for a potential three-lane bypass that would run within half a mile of the horse, with a  business park and 550 new homes on Green Belt land. Some local residents, together with many from outside the town, were against the "Swindonisation" of their corner of West Wiltshire, although many residents felt that Westbury, as the only town on the A350 without a bypass and whose medieval heart was blighted by pollution and HGVs needed a bypass.

Battle of Ethandun Memorial 

Although the horse is only presumed to commemorate King Alfred's victory at the Battle of Ethandun, an official monument to the victory was erected atop the hill, adjacent to Bratton Camp. The monument does not have an official name but is known as the Battle of Ethandun Memorial. It consists of a large sarsen stone (stone of remembrance) with a "pebbled" base, on which lies a metal commemorative plaque. The monument was unveiled 5 November 2000 by the 7th Marquess of Bath.

King Alfred's Tower, near Stourhead, is the best known monument that was definitely built to celebrate King Alfred and his victory. The folly tower was erected in 1772, six years before the white horse was redesigned.

In popular culture 

The White Horse was referenced in G. K. Chesterton's epic poem The Ballad of the White Horse (1911) and the books The Tontine (1955) by Thomas B. Costain, The Emigrants (1980) by Caribbean author George Lamming, and in the novel The English Patient (1992) by Michael Ondaatje, as the place where the sapper Kip learned how to deactivate bombs. Michael Morpurgo mentioned it as one of the inspirations for The Butterfly Lion.

The figure can be seen in the music video for Scottish guitarist Midge Ure's 1996 single "Breathe", and is featured in the current opening titles of the regional television news programme ITV News West Country. Furthermore, it featured in a 2015 Visit England tourist advertisement produced in association with the England rugby team.

The horse lends its name to White Horse Business Park outside Trowbridge and White Horse Country Park outside Westbury. The horse overlooks both parks. White Horse Way is also a name of a street in Westbury, and the town's visitor centre features the horse in its logo, as does its golf club.

The horse was depicted by artist Eric Ravilious (1903–1942) in his watercolour paintings "Train Landscape" and "The Westbury Horse" 1939.

See also 
List of hill figures in Wiltshire
 Cherhill White Horse
 Marlborough White Horse
 Litlington White Horse

References 

Works cited
Reverend Francis Wise, Further Observations on the White Horse and other Antiquities in Berkshire (1742)
William Plenderleath, White Horses of the West of England (1885, 2nd edition 1892)
Morris Marples, White Horses and Other Hill Figures (1949)
 Westbury White Horse at Wiltshire White Horses
 The White (ish) Horse at ThisisWestbury.co.uk, Westbury's history website
 Wiltshire Web information

Notes

Bibliography 
 Plenderleath, Rev. W. C., The White Horses of the West of England (London: Allen & Storr, 1892)

Tourist attractions in Wiltshire
Archaeological sites in Wiltshire
Protected areas of Wiltshire
White horses (hill figures) in England
History of Wiltshire
Buildings and structures completed in 1778
Westbury, Wiltshire